Percy Challenger (September 3, 1858 – July 23, 1932) was a film and theater actor in the United States. He appeared in dozens of films.

He was born in England. He acted in and managed the eastern tour of Virginia Drew Prescott (Melbourne MacDowell)'s playlet Man of the People.

Challenger was a vaudeville actor. A 1911 performance in Chicago was reviewed by The Billboard, reading, "Percy Challenger, an English entertainer, was first on the program, and although his act was rather odd, it seemed to take very well. Mr. Challenger's work as an elocutionist was very good".

He won plaudits as a supporting actor in films. His performance in Flames of Chance (1918) was received as "clever" in a review in Variety. Variety reviewed his performance in Trumpet (1920) positively, noting, "Percy Challenger comes in for a bit in the role of Valinsky, a dunk-investor. The detail with which he dresses the character is striking. He also contributed valuable assistance..."

He continued his theatre involvement during his time in California. He was involved with Marion Warde Dramatic School in Los Angeles. He performed humorous monologues and pianologues at the opening of the Alhambra Community Theatre in November 1924.

Several months before he died, Challenger performed as various Dickens characters in La Canada, California. He died on July 23, 1932 in Los Angeles, California.

Theater
The Eel (1916)

Filmography
The Medicine Man (1916)
Three Armed Maggie (1916)
The Sudden Gentleman (1917), as Old Miles
Ashes of Hope (1917), as Flat Foot
The Spirit of Romance (film) (1917), as Richard Cobb
The Law's Outlaw (1918), as Clarence Cecil Hartley
The Lonely Woman (1918)
Little Red Decides (1918), as Little Doc
One Week of Life (1919)
Blind Husbands (1919)
What Every Woman Wants (1919 film), as Timothy Dunn
One Week of Life (1919)
In the Heart of a Fool (1920) as Daniel Sands
Uncharted Channels (1920), as Roger Webb
Trumpet Island (1920), as Valinsky
The Cheater, as Mr. Prall
False Kisses (1921)
 The Magnificent Brute (1921)
 Wolves of the North (1921)
Her Mad Bargain (1921)
The Sting of the Lash (1921), as Rorke
Nobody's Fool (1921 film), as Joshua Alger
Taking Chances (1922), as James Arlington
Smilin' Jim (1922)
Tracked to Earth (1922), as Zed White
Wild Honey (1922 film), as Ebenezer Learnish
The Galloping Kid (1922)
Kissed (1922 film), as Editor Needham
Around the World in 18 Days (1923), a serial, as Rand
The Social Buccaneer (1923), a 10 episode serial, as Steele
Single Handed (1923 film), as Professor Weighoff
 High Speed (1924)
Sword of Valor (1924)
The Wheel of Destiny  (1927)
The Sky Hawk (1929), as Charles the Butler (uncredited)

Further reading 

 Katchmer, George A. "Forgotten Cowboys and Cowgirls--Part XVII." Classic Images. August 1991, Iss. 194, pg. 44.

References

External links 

 
1858 births
1932 deaths
English emigrants to the United States
20th-century American male actors
Vaudeville performers